Karma: Operation Barbarossa (Korean: 카르마2, also known as Karma 2) is a free online first-person shooter developed by Dragonfly, Futureport, and Blueside, and it is distributed by Dragonfly. It is the sequel to Karma Online. Karma: Operation Barbarossa was planned to be published in North America by free-to-play publisher ijji, but has been officially canceled. In March 2011, Joymax picked up the rights to publish the game globally under the name Karma Online: Prisoners Of The Dead.

Story
In 1941, Germany conquered most of the continent of Europe and the Soviet Union fight back against the ever expanding Germany. Karma II is based on this nonfictional story about World War II.

External links
 Korean official website
 English official website

2009 video games
Ijji
Video games developed in South Korea
Windows games
Windows-only games
World War II video games
Video game sequels